The Wahweap Formation of the Grand Staircase–Escalante National Monument is a geological formation in southern Utah and northern Arizona, around the Lake Powell region, whose strata date back to the Late Cretaceous (Campanian stage). Dinosaur remains are among the fossils that have been recovered from the formation.

Age 
The Wahweap formation is divided into four members, which are listed below with their respective ages:

 Last Chance Creek Member: 82.17-81.55 Ma
 Reynolds Point Member: 81.55-80.61 Ma
 Coyote Point Member: 80.61-79 Ma
 Pardner Canyon Member: 79-77.29 Ma

Paleobiota

Invertebrates
The Wahweap Formation shows a substantial amount of invertebrate activity ranging from fossilized insect burrows in petrified logs to various mollusks that characterize the shell beds. Large fossilized crabs are common at most shell bed sites in the Wahweap, and over 1,900 gastropod specimens (of four likely genera) have been unearthed in the formation's siltstone.

Elasmobranchs

Osteichthyes

Salamanders

Dinosaurs

Dinosaurs known from the Wahweap include at least 2 species of hadrosaur, at least two ceratopsians and at least one theropod.

Mammals

A fair number of mammals spanning the lower Campanian are known from the Wahweap as well, including at least 15 genera of multituberculates, cladotherians, marsupials, and placental insectivores.

Trace fossils
Trace fossils are also relatively abundant in the Wahweap, and include vertebrate tracks as well as burrow activity. Tracks preserved in the capping sandstone indicate the presence of crocodylomorphs, which had been previously known in this area only from teeth elements, as well as ornithischian dinosaurs. At least one possible theropod track has been identified in this area as well.

In 2010 a unique trace fossil from the Wahweap was discovered that indicates a predator–prey relationship between dinosaurs and primitive mammals. The trace fossil includes at least two fossilized mammalian den complexes as well as associated digging grooves presumably caused by a maniraptoran dinosaur. The proximity indicates a case of probable active predation of the burrow inhabitants by the owners of the claw marks.

See also

 List of dinosaur-bearing rock formations

References 

Geologic formations of Arizona
Geologic formations of Utah
Cretaceous Arizona
Cretaceous geology of Utah
Campanian Stage
Grand Staircase–Escalante National Monument
Upper Cretaceous Series of North America
Ichnofossiliferous formations